The National People's Ambassadors (NPA) is a South African political party formed in 2015. It describes itself as a "radical, left, anti-capitalist and anti-imperialist movement with an internationalist outlook”, and wishes to nationalise mines and banks.

In 2016, general secretary Andile Hlatshwayo laid charges of high treason against the Economic Freedom Fighters Julius Malema.

Also in 2016, the party attempted to organise a strike in the Alfred Duma Local Municipality, aiming to shut all 36 wards in the municipality. The strike was called off after the NPA failed to meet the legal requirements.

The party contested the 2019 general election, failing to win any seats, and receiving the fewest votes of all 48 parties contesting nationally.

Election results

National elections 

|-
! Election
! Total votes
! Share of vote
! Seats 
! +/–
! Government
|-
! 2019
| 1,979
| 0.01%
| 
| –
| 
|}

Provincial elections 

! rowspan=2 | Election
! colspan=2 | Eastern Cape
! colspan=2 | Free State
! colspan=2 | Gauteng
! colspan=2 | Kwazulu-Natal
! colspan=2 | Limpopo
! colspan=2 | Mpumalanga
! colspan=2 | North-West
! colspan=2 | Northern Cape
! colspan=2 | Western Cape
|-
! % !! Seats
! % !! Seats
! % !! Seats
! % !! Seats
! % !! Seats
! % !! Seats
! % !! Seats
! % !! Seats
! % !! Seats
|-
! 2019
| - || -
| - || -
| - || -
| 0.04% || 0/80
| - || -
| - || -
| - || -
| - || -
| - || -
|}

References 

2015 establishments in South Africa
Political parties in South Africa
Political parties established in 2015
Socialist parties in South Africa